The Eleutherna Bridge is an ancient Greek corbel arch bridge near the Cretan town of Eleutherna, Greece. A similar second bridge standing a short distance south of it collapsed toward the end of the 19th century, with only very few traces remaining.

Description
The well-preserved structure has a single span of 3.95 m, which is quite large for a false arch. The opening is cut from the unmortared limestone blocks in the shape of an isosceles triangle, the height of which is 1.84 m. The overall length of the bridge measures 9.35 m. Its width varies from 5.1 to 5.2 m, with the structure converging slightly towards its center point above the arch (5.05 m width there). The height is between 4 and 4.2 m.

History
The bridge, which is still in use, was first described by the Englishman T.A.B. Spratt in his Travels and Researches in Crete, after he had paid a visit to the site in 1853. At the time, another ancient bridge with a triangular arch was still standing a few hundred metres away, but, judging from a later report, was destroyed some unknown time before 1893.

Date
While there is general agreement that the two bridges of Eleutherna date to the pre-Roman period, a more precise dating is hampered by the lack of proper finds. According to Nakassis, the extant, northern bridge was built sometime during the Hellenistic period, while the Italian scholar Galliazzo dates the construction more precisely to the end of the 4th or beginning of the 3rd century BC. For the smaller, now collapsed southern bridge Nakassis cautiously supports a late Classical date.

See also
 List of Roman bridges

References

Sources

Further reading 
 Bougia, Polyxeni (1996), "Ancient Bridges in Greece and Coastal Asia Minor", Dissertation, University of Pennsylvania

External links

Ancient bridges in Greece
Corbel arch bridges
Stone bridges in Greece
Rethymno (regional unit)
Buildings and structures in Crete